Malato is a surname of Italian origin. People with the surname Malato include:
Charles Malato, a French anarchist
Giusi Malato, an Italian water polo player
José Carlos Malato, a Portuguese television presenter